Dụ Tông is the temple name used for several emperors of Vietnam. It may refer to:

Trần Dụ Tông (1336–1369, reigned 1341–1369), emperor of the Trần dynasty
Lê Dụ Tông (1679–1731, reigned 1705–1729), king of the Lê dynasty

Temple name disambiguation pages